2022 is an Extremely Wet Year for Australia, coming out of a back-to-back La Niña in the summer of 2021-22, a Negative Indian Ocean Dipole developing over the winter and a third back-to-back La Niña in the Spring of 2022.

Monthly Records

January 
Rainfall Nation-wide in January 2022 was 30% higher than average, the 4th highest on record for South Australia and the 7th Highest for Victoria (Australia).

Ex-Tropical Cyclone Seth bought over 400mm of Rain to the hills outside Gympie, with 674mm falling in Marodian, Queensland.

Cyclone Tiffany (2022) bought heavy rain to Far North Queensland, crossing the Gulf of Carpentaria and moving inland of Western Australia, bringing heavy rain to the Outback, inland WA, Southern NT, and South Australia, isolating many communities.

February 
More information; see: 2022 eastern Australia floods

A blocking high at the end of the month brought record breaking rain for Eastern Australia. 

677mm fell in Brisbane in 3 days from the 28th breaking the old 3 day rainfall record of 600.4mm in 1974 Brisbane recorded its highest February rainfall on record recording 887mm. Cities such as Toowoomba and the Sunshine Coast had their monthly record broken and Gympie recording their wettest February in 30 years.

On the 28th, 701.8mm fell in Rosebank, being the wettest day recorded for NSW since 1954 and the highest in the Nation since 1998, the third highest in the state.

March 
March Rainfall was 74% above average for NSW, and 35% above average for Victoria however overall rain was 27% below average for Australia. 

A large number of sites in NSW recorded their wettest March on record, in Greater Sydney, Illawarra, Northern Rivers and the Mid North Coast saw numerous daily records and monthly records broken. With totals in excess of 1000mm being recorded.

Sydney broke its all time March record with 537mm falling throughout the month, breaking the old record of 521.4mm set in 1942.

April 
Rainfall was 27% above average nation-wide. the 9th highest on record for both NSW and QLD. Rainfall was above average, especially for the South Coast, Central and Western NSW. parts of Upper Western Queensland experienced their wettest April on record.

May 
May rainfall was 40% above average for Australia.

A cold front and low pressure system crossed Tasmania at the start of the Month seeing record daily rainfalls for May. Many stations saw rainfall daily records along the East Coast of QLD and the Pilbara. Heavy Rain fell over large parts of Queensland with totals from 150mm - 300mm were common. An upper level cloud-band embedded with thunderstorms brought record breaking rain to the Pilbara with towns such as Onslow, Western Australia and Mardie, Western Australia breaking their May rainfall record, 310.4mm and 268.8mm being received.

Queensland recorded its fifth-wettest May on Record with being 145.8% above average, numerous stations recorded their wettest May on Record. Eumundi, Queensland receiving 645.4mm.

Hobart saw its wettest May on record recording 133.4mm and seeing its wettest May day on record also.

June 
June was drier than Average for large parts of the Country, NSW experiencing its 8th driest June. Northern Territory's rainfall was above average and several stations broke June records. Large parts of the NT experience a Dry season during this time so above average rainfalls do not have to be significant.

July 
More information; see: 2022 New South Wales floods

An Australian east coast low affected NSW during the start of the month, bringing torrential rain to South Coast, Illawarra, Greater Sydney, Mid North Coast and the Hunter Region. With Numerous records being broken. Daily Records were smashed in many stations, Taree breaking their all-time daily record receiving 305mm on the 7th. Darkes Forest, New South Wales broke a 122-year-old record receiving 875mm. Cities such as Katoomba, Central Coast, and Campbelltown saw their July Rainfall Records Broken. Sydney received 8 months of rain in 4 days. Sydney recorded 344.2mm for July. 

A number of Stations in QLD broke their July Records, such as Kuranda, Queensland receiving 231.1mm

August 
Numerous Cold Fronts swept across Southern Australia. Parts of Southern and Central NSW recorded their wettest August on record, Parkes, New South Wales saw 95.8mm and Thredbo, New South Wales recorded 424.8mm. Canberra recorded its highest daily rainfall on the 5th, recording 54.8mm. 

Sydney reached 2000mm in record time on the 31st August

September 
September was the fifth-highest on record for Australia. With out of season heavy rain affected North West WA and Tropical moisture being brought down to the southern states through a large cloud band causing heavy rain and storms and an offshore low pressure system brought heavy rain to North East NSW and South East Queensland. 

On the 3rd of September, a low pressure system crossed the Gascoyne, WA and 15% of the state experienced its highest September daily rainfall on record. Towns such as Meekatharra, Western Australia broke its September rain record receiving 56.4mm. Large parts of the Pilbara and Gascoyne experienced the wettest September on record. 

Much of Victoria's north experienced above average rainfall, with sites having their highest September rainfall on record. Ultima, Victoria received 155mm, its highest on record for September. other towns that experienced record rain are Swan Hill and Combienbar. 

NSW recorded its 5th highest September rainfall on record, with the Lower Western, Central West, Northern Tablelands, Mid North Coast and Northern Rivers all experiencing above average rainfall. Many sites had their highest September rainfall on record. Tamworth, experienced its wettest September on recording 145.2mm. Other towns that broke the September rainfall records include: Pilliga, Barraba, Narrabri and Murwillumbah.

October 
More Information; See: 2022 south eastern Australia floods

The beginning of October saw Sydney break its all time yearly record recording 2,199.8mm on the 6th of October. Beating the all time annual high set in 1950 of 2194mm. Every new rain total will result in the record being broken. 

Canberra broke its all time October record on the 27th of October, beating the 1976 record of 161mm.

Heavy rainfall affected large parts of Victoria and Tasmania, heavy rain continued through NSW throughout the Month. 

as of 29th October, towns in North NSW have seen their wettest October on record, Moree, Narrabri, Armidale, Gunnedah and Tamworth. 

Many towns across victoria have seen their wettest October on record such as Echuca, Bendigo and Shepparton. 

Sydney has broken its all time October record on the 24th receiving 286.8mm.

See also 

 Weather of 2022
 1950 Australian rainfall records
 Floods in Australia

References

Weather records